Özge Kırdar Kinasts (born November 26, 1985, in Kütahya, Turkey)is a Turkish volleyball player. She currently plays for Eczacıbaşı VitrA and wears number 9. She is regular national team player.

Career
Kırdar won the 2016–17 Challenge Cup and won the tournament's Most Valuable Player award.

Personal life
Kırdar is married to Girts Kinasts (former CI at Flyspot and current Nine Set manager). She is the twin sister of VakıfBank Güneş Sigorta Türk Telekom outside hitter Gözde Kırdar.

Clubs
 Yeşilyurt (2005–2006)
 Fenerbahçe (2006–2007)
 Ereğli Belediyespor (2007–2008)
 VakıfBank Güneş Sigorta Türk Telekom (2008-2012)
 Eczacıbaşı VitrA (2012-2013)
 MKS Dąbrowa Górnicza (2013-2015)
 Lokomotiv Baku (2015-2016)
 Bursa BB (2016-2017)

Awards

Individuals
 Women's CEV Champions League 2010–11 "Best Setter"
 2016–17 Challenge Cup "Most Valuable Player"''

Clubs
 2010–11 CEV Champions League -   Champion, with VakıfBank Güneş Sigorta Türk Telekom
 2011 FIVB Club World Championship -  Runner-Up, with VakıfBank Türk Telekom
 2011-12 Aroma League -  Runner-Up, with Vakıfbank Türk Telekom
 2012 Turkish Volleyball Super Cup -  Champion, with Eczacıbaşı VitrA
 2012-2013 Turkish Cup -  Runner-Up, with Eczacıbaşı VitrA
 2012-2013 Turkish League -  Runner-Up, with Eczacıbaşı VitrA
 2016–17 CEV Challenge Cup -  Champion, with Bursa BB

National team
 2011 European Championship - 
 2012 FIVB World Grand Prix -

See also
 Turkish women in sports

References

External links
 
 
 
 

1985 births
Living people
Turkish twins
Turkish women's volleyball players
VakıfBank S.K. volleyballers
Türk Telekom volleyballers
Yeşilyurt volleyballers
Fenerbahçe volleyballers
People from Kütahya
Twin sportspeople
Olympic volleyball players of Turkey
Volleyball players at the 2012 Summer Olympics
Mediterranean Games medalists in volleyball
Mediterranean Games silver medalists for Turkey
Competitors at the 2009 Mediterranean Games
Competitors at the 2013 Mediterranean Games